Mark James Philip Wilkinson (born 21 October 1977) is an English former professional rugby union player. He spent his three-year professional career at Newcastle Falcons, alongside his brother, Jonny Wilkinson, predominantly playing as a Centre.

Career

Early career
Born in Wokingham, Wilkinson played for National League 3 North side Darlington Mowden Park during the 2001/02 season, making 20 appearances and scoring 3 tries.

2002–2006
In August 2002, Wilkinson signed for Newcastle Falcons, where his brother, Jonny, was captain. He made his professional debut against Leeds Carnegie, playing as centre, but unusually, for that position, wearing the 15 shirt. His performance drew praise from then-manager Rob Andrew, who stated "It was a pretty big debut for someone who hasn't played higher than Third Division North before." He made his European Challenge Cup debut in a 27–8 defeat to Treviso, His first appearance at fly-half, would not prove successful, as Newcastle lost 20–0 against London Irish. By the end of that season, he had made six appearances in the league and five in the Challenge Cup. He would feature far less the following season, making just four league appearances and two in the European Challenge Cup, although he did score his first professional tries against Valladolid RAC in a 71–10 victory for the Falcons. He made five Premiership appearances in the 2004/05 season, with his Heineken Cup debut coming against Newport Gwent Dragons, playing at fly half in a 25–17 victory. 2005/06 would see him play just once, a brief appearance from the replacement's bench in a 27–18 defeat against Saracens.

Post-retirement
In 2006, Wilkinson retired from professional rugby, aged 28, to become the academy fitness and conditioning coach at Newcastle, at the same time Rob Bowen joined the club's academy. He remained in the post for three years, before departing the club in 2009. Two years after his departure, he started the Fineside clothing range alongside his brother.

References

1977 births
Living people
English rugby union players
Newcastle Falcons players
Rugby union centres
Rugby union players from Wokingham